is a passenger railway station in the city of  Yotsukaidō, Chiba Prefecture, Japan, operated by the East Japan Railway Company (JR East).

Lines

Station layout
The station consists of a single side platform and an island platform connected to the station building by a footbridge. The station has a Midori no Madoguchi staffed ticket office.

Platforms

History
Yotsukaidō Station was opened on December 9, 1894 as a station on the Sōbu Railway for both passenger and freight operations. On September 1, 1907, the Sōbu Railway was nationalised, becoming part of the Japanese Government Railway (JGR).  After World War II, the JGR became the Japan National Railways (JNR). Scheduled freight operations were suspended from February 1, 1974. A new elevated station building was completed in December 1981. The station was absorbed into the JR East network upon the privatization of the Japan National Railways (JNR) on April 1, 1987. A new station building was completed in 2002.

Passenger statistics
In fiscal 2019, the station was used by an average of 21,975 passengers daily

Surrounding area
 Yotsukaidō City Hall
 Yotsukaidō High School

See also
 List of railway stations in Japan

References

External links

 JR East station information 

Railway stations in Chiba Prefecture
Railway stations in Japan opened in 1894
Sōbu Main Line
Yotsukaidō